John Drummond (died 1752), 10th of Lennoch and 3rd of Megginch Castle in Perthshire, was a Scottish Member of Parliament.

He was the oldest son of Adam Drummond of Megginch (1649-1709), 9th of Lennoch and his wife Alison, daughter of John Hay of Haystoun. His father was a member of the Scottish Parliament and a member of the Privy Council of Scotland.  His brother Adam Drummond (1679-1758) a  surgeon-apothecary in Edinburgh became (jointly) the first Professor of Anatomy at the University of Edinburgh.

Career 
At the 1727 general election he was elected as the Member of Parliament (MP) for Perthshire, defeating the sitting MP Mungo Haldane.
The election was closely fought, and was decided by a circle centred on Robert Craigie, who chose Drummond, the favoured candidate of the 2nd Duke of Atholl.

Drummond voted infrequently in the House of Commons, and retired from Parliament at the 1734 election.

Personal life 

In 1712 he married Bethia Murray, daughter of James Murray of Deucar.  They had five sons and one daughter:
 Adam (1713–1786), an army officer, and an MP for most of the years 1761–84
 Patrick, Francis and John died before their parents
 Colin, born 1722, who had ten children, including John (1754–1835, MP for Shaftesbury); General Gordon Drummond (1772–1854), and Admiral Sir Adam Drummond KCH, who bought Megginch Castle from his older brother, Robert Drummond, a Captain of an East Indiaman ship trading with the Far East.
 Jean married the 2nd Duke of Atholl in 1749, after the death of the Duke's first wife. After the Duke's death she remarried, to Lord Adam Gordon

His nickname was "Sir Francis Wronghead", after a character in the play The Provoked Husband.

References 
 

Year of birth unknown
1752 deaths
People from Perthshire
Members of the Parliament of Great Britain for Scottish constituencies
British MPs 1727–1734